Jaroslav Váňa is a Czechoslovak retired slalom canoeist who competed in the early 1950s. He won two medals at the 1951 ICF Canoe Slalom World Championships in Steyr with a gold in the C-1 team event and a silver in the C-1 event.

References

Czechoslovak male canoeists
Czech male canoeists
Possibly living people
Year of birth missing (living people)
Medalists at the ICF Canoe Slalom World Championships